Shuka –Yehoshua (Joshua) Glotman (born 1953, in Israel) is a mixed-media artist including photography, experimental filmmaking, installation and text. Currently he is lecturing in the Tel-Aviv University and in the Beer-Sheba University. He is a curator and a group facilitator specializing in facilitating discussion between Israelis and Palestinians. Glotman lives in a small village in the Upper Western Galilee.

Biography

Glotman grew up in Tel-Aviv. At the age of nine he started to take pictures. During 1975-6 he studied photography in Hadassah College Jerusalem and lived in London from 1977 to 1982 where he studied at the Polytechnic of Central London (now  University of Westminster, London) and had his first shows there. 
Since 1982, back in Israel, he became involved as an artist in community art and art education. His first show in Israel went on in 1984. Since, his works have been exhibited in shows in Israel and abroad.
In 1998 his video installation A Blow has been exhibited at the 24th Bienale de São Paulo, Brazil.
In 2000 he had one-man show Here Live Happily Mr. Poetic & Mr. Pathetic in the TLV Museum of Art. 
He has curated most of David Perlov's photo-exhibitions during his life and has published articles about his work.
Since 1992 he has been an active partner in Multi-Exposure, an exchange scheme for young artists from Palestine-Israel-Britain.

Publications
This is a selection of some of Shuka Glotman's published works:
 An Israeli's Album (Camera Obscura, TLV, 1988)
 Shuka Glotman (a catalogue for Here Live Happily Mr. Poetic & Mr. Pathetic, TLV Museum of Art, 2000)
 David Perlov: Color Photographs 2000-2003  (editor & writer, The Israeli Museum of Photography, Tel-Chai, 2003)
 Shuka Glotman: Photography Alive, 2006, Meir-Publishing House, Abirim, Israel 1380600, 
 Shuka Glotman :The Photographic Language at School. 1996, the University Publishers, Tel Aviv. 
 Shuka Glotman: Between Treetops and Clouds. 2015, Meir-Publishing House, Abirim, Israel. 1380600, 
 Shuka Glotman: An Israeli's Album (revised edition). 2015, Meir-Publishing House, Abirim, Israel. 1380600,

Awards

 The Ministry of Culture Prize for Art for 2006
 The Klachkin Prize for 2000, The America- Israel Cultural Fund.
 Winner of the Porizki Prize for Photography, 1996, Tel-Aviv Museum of Art.
 Winner of the Arts & Science Ministry Prize for 1995.
 The Enrique Kavilin Photography Prize for 1994, Israel Museum.

References

Further reading
David Perlov, Color Photographs 2000-2003 2003, The Eli Lamberger Israeli Museum of Photography in the Tel-Hai Industrial Park. Editor-in-chief: Shuka Glotman,

External links
 Shuka Glotman - Artist Website
 About the show Whisper of Tears
 About the series Non-historical moments in Family traces
 About David Perlov
 About Multi-Exposure
 About the show A German Melody
 

Israeli artists
Living people
1953 births